Oh Seul-ki (born 20 August 1987) is a South Korean badminton player. She was the girls' doubles bronze medallists at the 2004 Asian and World Junior Championships partnered with Ha Jung-eun, also claimed the silver medal in the Asian girls' team and World mixed team. Oh who was educated at the Jeonju Sungsim Girls' high school was the champion at the 2003 Indonesia Junior tournament. She won her first international title at the 2003 Norwegian International tournament in the women's doubles event. She then claimed doubles title at the 2005 Vietnam Satellite tournament by winning the women's and mixed doubles event. Oh then affiliated with the Yeongdong team became the runner-up at the 2012 Korean National Badminton Championships in the mixed doubles event with Jeon Jun-bum.

Achievements

World Junior Championships 
Girls' doubles

Asian Junior Championships
Girls' doubles

BWF International Challenge/Series
Women's doubles

Mixed doubles

 BWF International Challenge tournament
 BWF International Series tournament

References

External links
 

1987 births
Living people
South Korean female badminton players